The 2011 Middle Tennessee Blue Raiders football team represented Middle Tennessee State University as a member of the Sun Belt Conference during the 2011 NCAA Division I FBS football season. Led by sixth-year head coach Rick Stockstill, the Blue Raiders compiled an overall record 2–10 with a mark of 1–7 in conference play, placing eighth in the Sun Belt. The team played home games at Johnny "Red" Floyd Stadium in Murfreesboro, Tennessee.

Coaching changes
On January 13, 2011, it was announced that both coordinators, Mike Schultz (Offensive) and Randall McCray (Defensive), would not return for the 2011 football season.  After a very successful 2009 season, when the team went 10–3 and won the New Orleans Bowl, during the 2010 season the team fell in several statistical categories. The team's turnover margin went from being ranked 8th in the nation to being 120th in the nation. Middle Tennessee's total offense fell from 27th in the nation to 69th in the nation, while their total defense fell from 50th in the nation to 72nd in the nation.  Both coordinators only served for one season at Middle Tennessee.

On January 24, 2011, Rick Stockstill announced that he promoted cornerbacks coach Steve Ellis to defensive coordinator and running backs coach Willie Simmons to offensive coordinator.   Two days later, Coach Stockstill completed his staff by hiring Joe Cauthen to coach the linebackers and serve as the special team's coordinator, and Buster Faulkner to coach the quarterbacks and be the passing game coordinator.

During the season, on October 14, 2011, Willie Simmons abruptly resigned from his job as offensive coordinator following his arrest on aggravated assault charges.  On October 17, Buster Faulkner was named MTSU's offensive coordinator.

Schedule

Roster

References

Middle Tennessee
Middle Tennessee Blue Raiders football seasons
Middle Tennessee Blue Raiders football